Tyler G. Brown (born February 7, 1990) is a Canadian former professional ice hockey left winger. He most notably played in the American Hockey League (AHL) with the Adirondack Phantoms and the Hartford Wolf Pack.

Playing career
Undrafted, Brown played major junior hockey with the Plymouth Whalers in the Ontario Hockey League before he was signed as a free agent to a three-year, entry-level contract with the Philadelphia Flyers on March 3, 2011.

Following the 2013–14 season, the Flyers did not tender Brown a qualifying offer, leaving him as an unrestricted free agent.  On September 5, 2014, the Greenville Road Warriors announced they had signed him to an ECHL contract. 

After two seasons in the American Hockey League with the Hartford Wolf Pack, Brown returned to Greenville as a free agent, signing a one-year deal with the Swamp Rabbits on September 12, 2016.

Following the 2016–17 season, Brown opted to continue in the ECHL, returning within the Philadelphia Flyers affiliate's with the Reading Royals on September 28, 2017. 

For the 2018-19 season, Brown re-signed with the Reading Royals on August 17, 2018. He was also named player-assistant coach.

Post-career
In 2019, Brown alongside his brother  Cody Brown founded Brown Hockey Academy.

Career statistics

References

External links

1990 births
Adirondack Phantoms players
Canadian ice hockey centres
Canadian ice hockey left wingers
Greenville Road Warriors players
Greenville Swamp Rabbits players
Hartford Wolf Pack players
Ice hockey people from Ontario
Living people
Plymouth Whalers players
Reading Royals players